Deh Zireh (also Romanized as Deh Zīreh; also known as Deh-e Zīr and Deh Jīreh) is a village in Khorram Dasht Rural District, in the Central District of Kashan County, Isfahan Province, Iran. At the 2006 census, its population was 65, in 30 families.

References 

Populated places in Kashan County